Saronno–Seregno railway is a railway line in Lombardy, Italy.

History 
The line was opened by the FNS on 31 December 1887.

See also 
 List of railway lines in Italy

References 

 Ferrovienord - Prospetto informativo della rete

External links 

Railway lines in Lombardy
Railway lines opened in 1887
1887 establishments in Italy